is an active stratovolcano located in Shikotsu-Toya National Park, Hokkaidō, Japan. It is also called , "Ezo" being an old name for the island of Hokkaido, because it resembles Mount Fuji. It is one of the 100 famous mountains in Japan.

Geology

Mount Yōtei is mostly composed of andesite and dacite. The stratovolcano is symmetrical, adding to its resemblance to Mount Fuji.

Eruptive history
Tephrochronology indicates two eruptions at Mount Yotei. The earlier eruption is dated from circa 3550 BC.

Climate

Etymology 
Mount Yōtei is also known as Ezo Fuji because of its almost perfectly conical shape resembling Mount Fuji, making it one of the “local Fujis” found in different regions of Japan.

Through Japan's Meiji, Taishō and Shōwa eras it was known by multiple names: “Shiribeshi-yama/Kōhō-Yōtei-zan", "Makkarinupuri" and "Ezo Fuji". On some maps it is also recorded as "Makkari-yama".

In the 50,000:1 scale topographical map of the “Rusutsu” area published in 1920 by Japan’s Land Surveying Department, the mountain is recorded as "Shiribeshi-Yōtei-zan (Ezo-Fuji)". However, since the name was difficult to read, the town of Kutchan asked for it to be changed to Yōtei-zan. The change took place in the November 1969 topographical map published by the Geospatial Information Authority of Japan. Since then, the current name of Yōtei-zan has become established.

The mountain’s former title of “Shiribeshi-Yōtei-zan” originates in the place-name of "Shiribeshi-Yōtei", which was recorded in the Nihon Shoki as the place where Abe no Hirafu established a domain in the article of May 17 in the year 659AD (Year 5 of the reign of Empress Kōgyoku). (The domain was established because the Ezo family groups of Ikashima and Uhona wished to receive the territory.) It is unclear whether this record refers to the same location as the current Mt Yōtei. The characters for “Shiribeshi” are also read as “Shiribe”, and the Chinese name of the Japanese dock plant is written with the Chinese characters for Yōtei, pronounced in Japanese as “shi”.

The Ainu called the mountain Makkarinupuri or Machineshiri (雌山) “female mountain”, and referred to the Shiribetsu-dake mountain to the southeast as Pinneshiri (雄山) “male mountain”. Shiribetsu-dake is also referred to by some fans as Zenpō-Yōteizan (written with the characters “Mt. Yōtei in front”), in contrast to Mt. Yōtei’s old name of Shiribeshi-Yōteizan (which is written with the characters for “Mt. Yotei behind”).

See also
 List of volcanoes in Japan

References

External links
 
   - Japan Meteorological Agency
 Yotei Zan - Geological Survey of Japan

Active volcanoes
Stratovolcanoes of Japan
Volcanoes of Hokkaido
Mountains of Hokkaido
Shikotsu-Tōya National Park
Highest points of Japanese national parks
Holocene stratovolcanoes